Park Chung-hee (14 November 1917 – 26 October 1979) was a South Korean politician and army general who served as President of South Korea from 1961 until his assassination in 1979; he ruled as an unelected military strongman from 1961 to 1963, then as the third President of South Korea from 1963 to 1979.

Before his presidency, he was the second-highest ranking officer in the South Korean army and came to power after leading a military coup in 1961, which brought an end to the interim government of the Second Republic. After serving for two years as chairman of the military junta, he was elected president in 1963, ushering in the Third Republic. During his rule, Park began a series of economic reforms that eventually led to rapid economic growth and industrialization, now known as the Miracle on the Han River, giving South Korea one of the fastest growing national economies during the 1960s and 1970s, albeit with costs to economic inequality and labor rights. This era also saw the formation of chaebols, family companies supported by the state similar to the Japanese zaibatsu, with prominent examples including Hyundai, LG, and Samsung that remain dominant and influential in the country today.

Although popular during the 1960s, Park's popularity started to plateau by the 1970s, with closer than expected victories during the 1971 presidential election and the subsequent legislative elections. In 1972, Park declared martial law and introduced the highly authoritarian Yushin Constitution, ushering in the Fourth Republic. Political opposition and dissent was now constantly repressed and Park had complete control of the military, and much control over the media and expressions of art. In 1979, Park was assassinated by close friend Kim Jae-gyu, director of the KCIA, following the Bu-Ma student demonstrations. Whether the assassination was spontaneous or premeditated remains unclear to this day. Economic growth continued in spite of the 1979 coup d'état and considerable political turmoil in the wake of his assassination. The country eventually democratized in 1987.

Park ruled South Korea as an authoritarian dictator, and remains a controversial figure in modern South Korean political discourse and among the South Korean populace in general, making a detached evaluation of his tenure difficult. While some credit him for sustaining economic growth, which reshaped and modernized South Korea, others criticize his authoritarian way of ruling the country (especially after 1971) and for prioritizing economic growth and social order at the expense of civil liberties and human rights. A Gallup Korea poll in October 2021 showed Park, Kim Dae-jung (an old opponent of Park that he tried to have executed), and Roh Moo-hyun as the most highly rated presidents of South Korean history in terms of leaving a positive legacy, especially among right-wing conservatives and the elderly. Park's eldest daughter Park Geun-hye later served as the 11th president of South Korea from 2013 until she was impeached and convicted of various corruption charges in 2017.

Early life and education

Park was born on 14 November 1917, in Gumi, North Gyeongsang, North Gyeongsang Province, Korea to parents Park Seong-bin and Baek Nam-ui. He was the youngest of five brothers and two sisters in a poor Yangban family. Extremely intelligent, egotistic and ambitious, Park's hero from his boyhood on was Napoleon, and he frequently expressed much disgust that he had to grow up in the poor and backward countryside of Korea, a place that was not suitable for someone like himself. Those who knew Park as a youth recalled that a recurring theme of his remarks was his wish to "escape" from the Korean countryside. As someone who had grown up under Japanese rule, Park often expressed his admiration for Japan's rapid modernization after the Meiji Restoration of 1867 and for Bushido, the Japanese warrior code.

As a youth, he won admission to a teaching school in Daegu and worked as a teacher in Mungyeong-eup after graduating in high school, but was reportedly a very mediocre student. The ambitious Park decided to enter the Manchukuo Army Military Academy in Changchun with help from Colonel Arikawa, a drill instructor at the teaching school in Daegu who was impressed by Park's military ambitions. During this time, he adopted the Japanese name . He graduated top of his class in 1942 and was recognized as a talented officer by his Japanese instructors, who recommended him for further studies at the Imperial Japanese Army Academy in Japan.

His talents as an officer were swiftly recognized and he was one of the few Koreans allowed to attend the Japanese Imperial Military Academy near Tokyo. He was subsequently posted to a Japanese Army regiment in Manchuria and served there until Japan’s surrender at the end of World War II.

Military career

In Manchukuo

After graduating fifth in the class of 1944, Park was commissioned as a lieutenant into the army of Manchukuo, a Japanese puppet-state, and served during the final stages of World War II as aide-de-camp to a regimental commander.

Return to Korea

Park returned to Korea after the war and enrolled at the Korea Military Academy. He graduated in the second class of 1946 (one of his classmates was Kim Jae-gyu, his close friend and later assassin) and became an officer in the constabulary army under the United States Army Military Government in South Korea. The newly established South Korean government, under the leadership of Syngman Rhee, arrested Park in November 1948 on charges that he led a Communist cell in the Korean constabulary. Park was subsequently sentenced to death by a military court, but his sentence was commuted by Rhee at the urging of several high-ranking Korean military officers. While Park had been a member of the Workers' Party of South Korea, the allegations concerning his involvement in a military cell were never substantiated. Nevertheless, he was forced out of the army. While working in the Army as an unpaid civilian assistant, he came across the 8th class of the Korea Military Academy (graduated in 1950), among whom was Kim Jong-pil, and this particular class would later serve as the backbone of the May 16 coup. Right after the Korean War began and with help from Paik Sun-Yup, Park returned to active service as a major in the South Korean Army. He was promoted to lieutenant colonel in September 1950 and to colonel in April 1951. As a colonel, Park was the deputy director of the Army Headquarters Intelligence Bureau in 1952 before switching to artillery and commanded the II and III Artillery Corps during the war. By the time the war ended in 1953, Park had risen to become a brigadier general. After the signing of the Korean Armistice Agreement, Park was selected for six-months training at Fort Sill in the United States.

After returning to Korea, Park rose rapidly in the military hierarchy. He was the head of the Army's Artillery School and commanded the 5th and 7th Divisions of the South Korean army before his promotion to major general in 1958. Park was then appointed Chief of Staff of the First Army and made the head of the Korean 1st and 6th District Command, which gave him responsibility for the defense of Seoul. In 1960, Park became commander of the Pusan Logistics Command before becoming Chief of the Operations Staff of the South Korean Army and the deputy commander of the Second Army. As such, he was one of the most powerful and influential figures in the military.

Rise to power
On 26 April 1960, Syngman Rhee, the authoritarian inaugural President of South Korea, was forced out of office and into exile following the 19 April Movement, a student-led uprising. A new democratic government took office on 13 August 1960. However, this was a short-lived period of parliamentary rule in South Korea. Yun Bo-seon was a figurehead president, with the real power vested in Prime Minister Chang Myon. Problems arose immediately because neither man could command loyalty from any majority of the Democratic Party or reach agreement on the composition of the cabinet. Prime Minister Chang attempted to hold the tenuous coalition together by reshuffling cabinet positions three times within five months.

Meanwhile, the new government was caught between an economy that was suffering from a decade of mismanagement and corruption under the Rhee presidency and the students who had instigated Rhee's ousting. Protesters regularly filled the streets making numerous and wide-ranging demands for political and economic reforms. Public security had deteriorated while the public had distrusted the police, which was long under the control of the Rhee government, and the ruling Democratic Party lost public support after long factional fighting.

Against this backdrop of social instability and division, Major General Park formed the Military Revolutionary Committee. When he found out that he was going to be retired within the next few months, he sped up the Committee's plans. It led a military coup on 16 May 1961, which was nominally led by Army Chief of Staff Chang Do-yong after his defection on the day it started. The military takeover rendered powerless the democratically elected government of President Yun, ending the Second Republic.

Initially, a new administration was formed from among those military officers who supported Park. The reformist military Supreme Council for National Reconstruction was nominally led by General Chang. Following Chang's arrest in July 1961, Park took overall control of the council. The coup was largely welcomed by a general populace exhausted by political chaos. Although Prime Minister Chang and United States Army General Carter Magruder resisted the coup efforts, President Yun sided with the military and persuaded the United States Eighth Army and the commanders of various ROK army units not to interfere with the new government. Soon after the coup, Park was promoted to Lieutenant General. The South Korean historian Hwang Moon Kyung described Park's rule as very "militaristic", noting right from the start Park aimed to mobilize South Korean society along "militaristically disciplined lines". One of Park's very first acts upon coming to power was a campaign to "clean up" the streets by arresting and putting the homeless to work in "welfare centers".

The American historian Carter Eckert wrote that the historiography, including his work, around Park has tended to ignore the "enormous elephant in the room" namely that the way in which Park sought kündaehwa (modernization) of South Korea was influenced by his distinctively militaristic way of understanding the world, and the degree in which the Japanophile Park was influenced by Japanese militarism as he created what South Korean historians call a "developmental dictatorship". Eckert called South Korea under Park's leadership one of the most militarized states in the entire world, writing that Park sought to militarize South Korean society in a way that no other South Korean leader has ever attempted. In the Imperial Japanese Army, there was the belief that Bushido would give Japanese soldiers enough "spirit" as to make them invincible in battle, as the Japanese regarded war as simply a matter of willpower with the side with the stronger will always prevailing. Reflecting his background as a man trained by Japanese officers, one of Park's favorite sayings was "we can do anything if we try" as Park argued that all problems could be overcome by sheer willpower. Eckert wrote when interviewing Park's closest friends, he always received the same answer when he asked them what was the important influence on Park, namely his officer training by the Japanese in Manchukuo. All of Park's friends told Eckert that to understand him, one needed to understand his Ilbonsik sagwan kyoyuk (Japanese officer training) as they all maintained Park's values were those of an Imperial Japanese Army officer.

On 19 June 1961, the military council created the Korean Central Intelligence Agency in order to prevent counter-coups and suppress potential enemies, both foreign and domestic. Along with being given investigative powers, the KCIA was also given the authority to arrest and detain anyone suspected of wrongdoing or having anti-government sentiments. Under its first director, retired Brigadier General Kim Jong-pil, a relative of Park and one of the original planners of the coup, the KCIA would extend its power to economic and foreign affairs.

President Yun remained in office, giving the military regime legitimacy. After Yun resigned on 24 March 1962, Lt. General Park, who remained chairman of the Supreme Council for National Reconstruction, consolidated his power by becoming acting president; he was also promoted to full general. Park agreed to restore civilian rule following pressure from the Kennedy administration.

In 1963, he was elected president in his own right as the candidate of the newly created Democratic Republican Party. He appointed Park Myung-keun, the Vice Leader of the party as the chief of the President's Office. He narrowly defeated former President Yun, the candidate of the Civil Rule Party, by just over 156,000 votes—a margin of 1.5 percent. Park would be re-elected president in 1967, defeating Yun with somewhat less difficulty.

Presidency (1962–1979)

Foreign policy
In June 1965 Park signed a treaty normalizing relations with Japan, which included payment of reparations and the making of soft-loans from Japan, and led to increased trade and investment between South Korea and Japan. In July 1966 South Korea and the United States signed a Status of Forces Agreement establishing a more equal relationship between the two countries. With its growing economic strength and the security guarantee of the United States, the threat of a conventional invasion from North Korea seemed increasingly remote. Following the escalation of the Vietnam War with the deployment of ground combat troops in March 1965, South Korea sent the Capital Division and the 2nd Marine Brigade to South Vietnam in September 1965, followed by the White Horse Division in September 1966. Throughout the 1960s, Park made speeches in which he blamed the Anglo-Japanese Alliance and the British for Japan's takeover of Korea.

Vietnam War

At the request of the United States, Park sent approximately 320,000 South Korean troops to fight alongside the United States and South Vietnam during the Vietnam War; a commitment second only to that of the United States. The stated reasons for this were to help maintain good relations with the United States, prevent the further advance of communism in East Asia and to enhance the Republic's international standing. In January 1965, on the day when a bill mandating a major deployment passed the National Assembly (with 106 votes for and 11 against), Park announced that it was "time for South Korea to wean itself from a passive position of receiving help or suffering intervention, and to assume a proactive role of taking responsibility on major international issues." South Korean soldiers were not able to ultimately defeat the Viet Cong, even though South Korea was quite successful. They also gained a reputation for brutality towards civilians.

Although primarily to strengthen the military alliance with the United States, there were also financial incentives for South Korea's participation in the war. South Korean military personnel were paid by the United States federal government and their salaries were remitted directly to the South Korean government. Park was eager to send South Korean troops to Vietnam and vigorously campaigned to extend the war. In return for troop commitments, South Korea received tens of billions of dollars in grants, loans, subsidies, technology transfers, and preferential markets, all provided by the Johnson and Nixon administrations.

North Korea

Park oversaw transitional changes between the two Koreas from conflict to consolidation. In 1961, the North Korean leader, Kim Il-sung secretly sent Hwang Tae-song, a former friend of Park Chung-hee and a vice-minister in ministry of trade, to South Korea, hoping to improve inter-Korean relations. However, in order to dissipate the suspicions about his Communist leanings and assure Americans his firm stance as an ally, Park decided to execute Hwang as a spy.

Beginning in October 1964, North Korea increased the infiltration of its intelligence-gatherers and propagandists into the South. More than 30 South Korean soldiers and at least 10 civilians had been killed in clashes with North Korean infiltrators by October 1966.

In October 1966, Park ordered the Korean Army to stage a retaliatory attack without seeking the approval of General Charles Bonesteel. This action, which was in retaliation for ongoing South Korean losses, caused tension between Park's government and the U.S. command in Korea, which wished not to violate the armistice.

Between 1966 and 1969 the clashes escalated as Park's armed forces were involved in firefights along the Korean DMZ. The fighting, sometimes referred to as the Second Korean War, was related to a speech given by Kim Il-sung on 5 October 1966 in which the North Korean leader challenged the legitimacy of the 1953 Armistice Agreement. Kim stated that irregular warfare could now succeed in a way conventional warfare could not because the South Korean military was now involved with the ever-growing Vietnam War. He believed Park's administration could be undermined if armed provocation by North Korea was directed against U.S. troops. This would force United States to reconsider its worldwide commitments. Any splits would give the North an opportunity to incite an insurgency in the South against Park.

On 21 January 1968, the 31-man Unit 124 of North Korean People's Army special forces commandos attempted to assassinate Park and nearly succeeded. They were stopped just 800 metres from the Blue House by a police patrol. A fire fight broke out and all but two of the North Koreans were killed or captured. In response to the assassination attempt, Park organized Unit 684, a group intended to assassinate Kim Il-Sung. It was disbanded in 1971.

Despite the hostility, negotiations were conducted between the North and South regarding reunification. On 4 July 1972 both countries released a joint statement specifying that reunification must be achieved internally with no reliance on external forces or outside interference, that the process must be achieved peacefully without the use of military force, and that all parties must promote national unity as a united people over any differences of ideological and political systems. The United States Department of State was not happy with these proposals and, following Park's assassination in 1979, they were quietly buried.

On 15 August 1974, Park was delivering a speech in the National Theater in Seoul at the ceremony to celebrate the 29th anniversary of the ending of colonial rule when a man named Mun Se-gwang fired a gun at Park from the front row. The would-be assassin, who was a Japanese-born North Korean sympathizer, missed Park but a stray bullet struck his wife Yuk Young-soo (who died later that day) and others on the stage. Park continued his speech as his dying wife was carried off the stage. Mun was hanged in a Seoul prison four months later. On the first anniversary of his wife's death, Park wrote in his diary "I felt as though I had lost everything in the world. All things became a burden and I lost my courage and will. A year has passed since then. And during that year I have cried alone in secret too many times to count."

Japan

On 22 June 1965, the Park administration and the government of Japan signed the Treaty on Basic Relations Between Japan and the Republic of Korea, which normalized relations between Japan and South Korea for the first time. Relations with Japan had previously not been officially established since Korea's decolonization and division at the end of World War II.

In January 2005, the government of the Republic of Korea uncovered 1,200 pages of diplomatic documents of the Treaty on Basic Relations between Japan and the Republic of Korea of 1965 that had been kept secret for forty years. These documents revealed that the Japanese government proposed to the government of the Republic of Korea, headed by Park Chung-hee, to directly compensate individual victims of Japanese colonization of Korea, but it was the Park administration that insisted it would handle the individual compensation to the victims, and took over the entire amount of the grant, 300 million dollars, (for 35 years of Japanese colonial rule in Korea), on behalf of the victims. The Park administration negotiated for a total of 360 million dollars in compensation for the 1.03 million Koreans conscripted into the forced labor and military service during the colonial period but received only 300 million dollars.

Economic policy

One of Park's main goals was to end the poverty of South Korea, and lift the country up from being a underdeveloped economy to a developed economy via statist methods. Using the Soviet Union and its Five Year Plans as a model, Park launched his first Five Year Plan in 1962 by declaring the city of Ulsan was a "special industrial development zone". The chaebol of Hyundai took advantage of Ulsan's special status to make the city the home of its main factories.

Park is credited with playing a pivotal role in the development of South Korea's tiger economy by shifting its focus to export-oriented industrialisation. When he came to power in 1961, South Korea's per capita income was only US$72.00. North Korea was the greater economic and military power on the peninsula due to the North's history of heavy industries such as the power and chemical plants, and the large amounts of economic, technical and financial aid it received from other communist bloc countries such as the Soviet Union, East Germany and China.

One of Park's reforms was to bring in 24 hour provision of electricity in 1964, which was a major change as previously homes and businesses were provided with electricity for a few hours every day. With the second Five Year Plan in 1967, Park founded the Kuro Industrial Park in southwestern Seoul, and created the state owned Pohang Iron and Steel Company Limited to provide cheap steel for the chaebol, who were founding the first automobile factories and shipyards in South Korea. Reflecting its etatist tendencies, the Park government rewarded chaebol who met their targets under the Five Year Plans with loans on easy terms of repayment, tax cuts, easy licensing and subsidies. It was common from the late 1960s onward for South Koreans to speak of the "octopus" nature of the chaebol as they began to extend their "tentacles" into all areas of the economy. Some of the successful chaebol like Lucky Goldstar (LG) and Samsung went back to the Japanese period while others like Hyundai were founded shortly after the end of Japanese rule; all would go to become world-famous companies. Hyundai, which began as a transport firm moving supplies for the U.S. Army during the Korean War, came to dominate the South Korean construction industry in the 1960s, and in 1967 opened its first car factory, building automobiles under license for Ford. In 1970, Hyundai finished the construction of the Seoul-Pusan Expressway, which became one of the busiest highways of South Korea, and in 1975 produced the Pony, its first car that was designed entirely by its own engineers. Besides manufacturing automobiles and construction, Hyundai moved into shipbuilding, cement, chemicals and electronics, ultimately becoming one of the world's largest corporations. On 3 August 1972, Park made the so-called "Emergency financial act of August 3rd(8·3긴급금융조치)" which banned all private loans to make the foundation of economic growth, and supported Chaebols even further.

A sign of the growth of the South Korean economy was that in 1969 there were 200,000 television sets in operation in South Korea, and by 1979 there were six million television sets operating in South Korea. In 1969, only 6% of South Korean families owned a television; by 1979 four of every five South Korean families owned a TV. However, all television in South Korea was in black and white, and the color television did not come to South Korea until 1979. Reflecting the growth of TV ownership, the state-owned Korean Broadcasting System (KBS) began to produce more programming, while private sector corporation MBC began operating in 1969. During the Yusin era, television productions were subjected to strict censorship with, for example, men with long hair being banned from appearing on TV, but soap operas became a cultural phenomenon in the 1970s, becoming extremely popular.

South Korean industry saw remarkable development under Park's leadership. Park viewed Japan's development model, in particular the Ministry of International Trade and Industry (MITI) and the Keiretsu, as an example for Korea. Park emulated MITI by establishing the Ministry of Trade and Industry (MTI) and the Economic Planning Board (EPB).  Government-corporate cooperation on expanding South Korean exports helped lead to the growth of some South Korean companies into today's giant Korean conglomerates, the chaebols.

However, this economic development of South Korea came at great sacrifice to the working class: the government did not recognise a minimum wage or weekly leave and imposed free work periods for its own benefit, and twelve-hour workdays were the norm. In addition, trade unions and industrial action were prohibited. Despite that, the fact that people who were in poverty were able to work stable jobs was welcomed by the vast majority of South Koreans.

According to the Gapminder Foundation Extreme poverty was reduced from 66.9 percent in 1961 to 11.2 percent in 1979, making this one of the fastest and largest reductions in poverty in human history. This growth also encompassed declines in child mortality and increases in life expectancy. From 1961 to 1979 child mortality declined by 64%, the third-fastest decrease in child mortality of any country with over 10 million inhabitants during the same period.

West Germany
Park's economic policy was highlighted by South Korea's relationship with West Germany. Park had an affinity for Germany due to its history of having strong leadership like that of Bismarck and Hitler, and wanted to create ties with West Germany to deal with the problems of increasing population growth and economic hardships and to receive an inflow of foreign capital for domestic development. Upon an agreement in 1961, South Korea sent labor forces to Germany, including more than 8,000 mine workers and 10,000 nurses, which continued until 1977. (See Gastarbeiter and Koreans in Germany)

Iran
Park was close friends with the last Shah of Iran, Mohammad Reza Pahlavi, who had established diplomatic relations in 1962 and following a visit to Iran in 1969, developed a close relationship with the two countries. Park realized the importance of Iran in securing oil for South Korea's industrial development and by 1973, was their main and only source of oil during the Oil Crisis. Most refineries in South Korea were built to process Iranian crude and thousands of engineers and workers were sent to Iran to help develop their refining capability. The relationship eventually expanded beyond oil as Park promoted other industries to operate in Iran. Many Chaebol's went to Iran, including Hyundai Engineering & Construction, whose first Middle East Project were a series of shipyards in Bandar Abbas and Chahbahar to help develop Iran's maritime industry. Park's favorite architect Kim Swoo-Geun and his office designed the Ekbatan Complex in Tehran and the South Korean Special Forces helped train the Imperial Iranian Navy Commandos.

Park invited the Shah in 1978 for a special "South Korea-Iran" summit to further deepen relations but due to the Iranian Revolution, it never materialized.
In preparation for that summit, Tehran and Seoul became sister cities and the two exchanged street names as well; Teheran-ro in Gangnam and Seoul Street in Tehran which both still remain.

Domestic policy
Among Park's first actions upon assuming control of South Korea in 1961 was to pass strict legislation metrifying the country and banning the use of traditional Korean measurements like the li and pyeong. Despite its strict wording, the law's enforcement was so spotty as to be considered a failure, with the government abandoning prosecution under its terms by 1970. In the end, South Korea's traditional units continued until June 2001.

After taking office for his second term in 1967, Park promised that, in accordance with the 1963 Constitution which limited the president to two consecutive terms, he would step down in 1971. However, soon after his 1967 victory, the Democratic Republican-dominated National Assembly successfully pushed through an amendment allowing the incumbent president —himself— to run for three consecutive terms.

In the meantime, Park grew anxious of the shift in US policy towards communism under Richard Nixon's Guam Doctrine. His government's legitimacy depended on staunch anti-communism, and any moderation of that policy from South Korea's allies (including the US) threatened the very basis of his rule. Park began to seek options to further cement his hold on the country. In May 1970, the Catholic poet Kim Chi-ha was arrested for supposedly violating the Anti-Communist Law for his poem Five Bandits, which in fact had no references to Communism either explicitly or implicitly,
but instead attacked corruption under Park. The issue of the journal Sasanggye that published the Five Bandits was shut down by the government. One of the eponymous bandits of the Five Bandits is described as a general who began his career fighting for Japan in World War Two, and all of the bandits of the poem are described as Chinilpa collaborators who served Japan because of their greed and amorality. Park recognized the reference to himself in Five Bandits with the character of the general while the fact that all of the bandits have a Chinilpa background was a reference to the social basis of Park's regime. In 1974, Kim was sentenced to death for his poem, and though he was not executed, he spent almost all of the 1970s in prison. Later in 1970, Park launched his Saemaul Undong (New Village Movement) that set out to modernize the countryside by providing electricity and running water to farmers, building paved roads, and replacing thatched roofs with tin roofs (the latter was said to reflect a personal obsession on the part of Park, who could not stand the sight of thatched roofs on farmers' homes, which for him was a sign of South Korea's backwardness).

However, Park used asbestos, which is harmful to humans, for fixing rustic houses.

In 1971, Park won another close election against his rival, Kim Dae-jung. That December, shortly after being sworn in, he declared a state of emergency "based on the dangerous realities of the international situation". In October 1972, Park dissolved the legislature and suspended the 1963 constitution in a self-coup. Work then began on drafting a new constitution. Park had drawn inspiration for his self-coup from Ferdinand Marcos, President of the Philippines, who had orchestrated a similar coup a few weeks earlier.

A new constitution, the so-called Yushin Constitution was approved in a heavily rigged plebiscite in November 1972. Meaning "rejuvenation" or "renewal" (as well as "restoration" in some contexts), scholars see the term's usage as Park alluding to himself as an "imperial president."

The new Yushin constitution was a highly authoritarian document. It transferred the presidential election process to an electoral college, the National Conference for Unification. It also dramatically expanded the president's powers. Notably, he was given sweeping powers to rule by decree and suspend constitutional freedoms. The presidential term was increased from four to six years, with no limits on re-election. For all intents and purposes, it codified the emergency powers Park had exercised for the past year, transforming his presidency into a legal dictatorship. As per his new constitution, Park ran for a fresh term as president in December 1972, and won unopposed. He was reelected in 1978 also unopposed. Many of South Korea's leading writers were opposed to the Park regime, and many of the best remembered poems and novels of the 1970s satirized the Yushin system.

Park argued that Western-style liberal democracy was not suitable for South Korea due to its still-shaky economy. He believed that in the interest of stability, the country needed a "Korean-style democracy" with a strong, unchallenged presidency. Although he repeatedly promised to open up the regime and restore full democracy, fewer and fewer people believed him.

In 1975, Park ordered homeless people and children to be removed from the streets of Seoul. Thousands of people were captured by the police and sent to thirty-six camps. The detainees were then used as free labor by the authorities and subjected to degrading treatment. Many died under torture.

Park abolished the usage of hanja or Chinese characters and established hangul exclusivity for the Korean language in the 1960s and 1970s. After a Five-Year Hangul Exclusivity Plan was promulgated through legislative and executive means, from 1970, using hanja became illegal in all grades of public school and in the military. This led to less illiteracy in South Korea.

The KCIA controlled the whole country, with more than forty thousand regular employees and one million correspondents. Striking workers, protesters or signatories of simple petitions faced long prison sentences and torture. The whole country was under constant surveillance.

Final years of presidency 
During his final years of presidency, Park realized that people were not satisfied with the government.
His autocracy became increasingly open in later years.

Military 
As president, Park tried to strengthen the military. He often said that if an independent country cannot protect itself with its military, it is not an independent country. Park ordered the development of missiles to attack Pyongyang. Due to a lack of technical knowledge, Korean engineers had to travel to the United States to learn how to produce missiles. After a painstaking development, on 26 September 1978, Nike Hercules Korea-1 had its successful first launch. But the development of missiles were stopped when Chun Doo-hwan reigned. Park also tried to develop his homegrown nuclear weapons programs, announcing that they would be made by 1983. This was never progressed after Park's death in 1979.

Death

Final years

Although the growth of the South Korean economy had secured a high level of support for Park's presidency in the 1960s, that support began to fade after economic growth started slowing in the early 1970s. Many South Koreans were becoming unhappy with his autocratic rule, his security services and the restrictions placed on personal freedoms. While Park had legitimised his administration, using the provisions laid down in the state of emergency laws dating back to the Korean War, he also failed to address the constitutional guarantees of freedom of speech and the press. Furthermore, the security service, the KCIA, retained broad powers of arrest and detention; many of Park's opponents were held without trial and frequently tortured. Eventually demonstrations against the Yushin system erupted throughout the country as Park's unpopularity began to rise.

These demonstrations came to a decisive moment on 16 October 1979, when a student group calling for the end of dictatorship and the Yushin system began at Busan National University. The action, which was part of the "Pu-Ma" struggle (named for the Pusan and Masan areas), soon moved into the streets of the city where students and riot police fought all day. By evening, up to 50,000 people had gathered in front of Busan city hall. Over the next two days several public offices were attacked and around 400 protesters were arrested. On 18 October, Park's government declared martial law in Busan. On the same day protests spread to Kyungnam University in Masan. Up to 10,000 people, mostly students and workers, joined the demonstrations against Park's Yushin System. Violence quickly escalated with attacks being launched at police stations and city offices of the ruling party. By nightfall a citywide curfew was put into place in Masan.

Assassination

On 26 October 1979, six days after the student protests ended, Park Chung-hee was shot in the head and chest fatally by Kim Jae-gyu, the director of the KCIA, after a banquet at a safehouse in Gungjeong-dong, Jongno-gu, Seoul. Other KCIA officers then went to other parts of the building shooting dead four more presidential guards. Cha Ji-chul, chief of the Presidential Security Service, was also fatally shot by Kim. Kim and his group were later arrested by soldiers under South Korea's Army Chief of Staff. They were tortured  and later executed. It is unclear whether this was a spontaneous act of passion by an individual or part of a pre-arranged attempted coup by the intelligence service. Kim claimed that Park was an obstacle to democracy and that his act was one of patriotism. The investigation's head, Chun Doo-hwan, rejected his claims and concluded that Kim acted to preserve his own power. Choi Kyu-hah became Acting President pursuant to Article 48 of the Yushin Constitution. Major General Chun Doo-hwan quickly amassed sweeping powers after his Defense Security Command was charged with investigating the assassination, first taking control of the military and the KCIA before installing another military junta and finally assuming the presidency in 1980.

Park, who was said to be a devout Buddhist, was accorded the first South Korean interfaith state funeral on 3 November in Seoul. He was buried with full military honors at the National Cemetery near the grave of former president Syngman Rhee who died in 1965. Kim Jae-gyu, whose motive for murdering Park remains unclear, was hanged on 24 May 1980.

Personal life 
Park was married to Kim Ho-nam (having one daughter with her) and the two later divorced. Afterwards, he married Yuk Young-soo, and the couple had two daughters and one son. Yuk was killed in the assassination attempt against Park in 1974.

Park's eldest daughter from his second marriage (with Yuk Young-soo), Park Geun-hye, was elected the chairwoman of the conservative Grand National Party in 2004. She was elected as South Korea's 11th president and first female president in 2012 and took office in February 2013. Park Geun-hye's association to her father's legacy has served as a double-edged sword. She had previously been labeled as the daughter of a dictator; however she has been quoted as saying "I want to be judged on my own merits." Her presidency ended in her impeachment in 2016 and removal from office in 2017. She was sentenced to 24 years in prison on 6 April 2018. Park was released in 2021 from the Seoul Detention Center.

Legacy 
Park Chung-hee remains a controversial figure in South Korea. The eighteen-year Park era is considered to be one of the most controversial topics for the Korean public, politicians, and scholars. Opinion is split regarding his legacy, between those who credit Park for his reforms and those who condemn his authoritarian way of ruling the country, especially after 1971. Older generations who spent their adulthood during Park's rule tend to credit Park for building the economic foundation of the country and protecting the country from North Korea, as well as leading Korea to economic and global prominence. Although Park was listed as one of the top ten "Asians of the Century" by Time magazine in 1999, the newer generations of Koreans and those who fought for democratization tend to believe his authoritarian rule was unjustified, and that he hindered South Korea's transition to democracy. 

Park has been recognized and respected by many South Koreans as an exceptionally efficient leader, credited with making South Korea economically what it is today. Park led the Miracle on the Han River, a period of rapid economic growth in South Korea. Under Park's rule, South Korea possessed one of the fastest growing national economies during the 1960s and 1970s. According to the Gapminder Foundation, extreme poverty was reduced from 66.9 percent in 1961 to 11.2 percent in 1979, making one of the fastest and largest reductions in poverty in human history. This growth also encompassed declines in child mortality and increases in life expectancy. From 1961 to 1979 child mortality declined by 64%, the third-fastest decrease in child mortality of any country with over 10 million inhabitants during the same period. Economic growth continued after Park's death and after considerable political turmoil in the wake of his assassination and the military Coup d'état of December Twelfth.

However, Park is regarded as a highly repressive dictator who curtailed freedoms and committed human rights abuses during his rule.  Dissolving the constitution to allow him unopposed rule. Park's blackmailing, arresting, jailing, and murdering of opposition figures are well documented. The new constitution President Park implemented after declaring the state of emergency in 1971 gave him the power to appoint one third of the members of the National Assembly and even outlawed criticism of the constitution and of the president. There were also many economic feats established during Park's regime, including the Gyeongbu Expressway, POSCO, the famous Five-Year Plans of South Korea, and the New Community Movement. In 1987, South Korea eventually democratized as a result of the June Struggle movement.

Park was accused of having pro-Japanese tendencies by some. Park is responsible for the beginning of a normalized relationship with Japan and today Japan is one of South Korea's top trading partners, surpassed only by the People's Republic of China and the United States.

Park's rule is also believed to be one of the main causes of regionalism which is a serious problem in Korea today.

Kim Dae-jung, a pro-democracy chief opponent of Park who was kidnapped, arrested, and sentenced to death by the Park administration, later served as the 8th president of South Korea. On 24 October 2007, following an internal inquiry, South Korea's National Intelligence Service (NIS) admitted that its precursor, the Korean Central Intelligence Agency (KCIA), undertook the kidnapping of opposition leader and future President Kim Dae-jung, saying it had at least tacit backing from then-leader Park Chung-hee.

Park Geun-hye, Park's eldest daughter, became the 11th president of South Korea and the first female president of South Korea. Park Geun-hye's parentage served as a considerable source of controversy during the 2012 presidential election and throughout her administration, as detractors described her as the daughter of a dictator. Park was impeached, removed from office, and later sentenced to 27 years in prison as a result of an influence-peddling scandal.

An October 2021 Gallup Korea public opinion poll showed Park Chung-hee, Roh Moo-hyun, and Kim Dae-jung as the most highly rated presidents of South Korean history. The poll showed Park received a favorability rating of 72% and 82% from citizens in the age range of 50–60 and 60+ years respectively, and a favorability rating of 43% and 64% from citizens in the age range of 20–30 and 30–40 years respectively.

Ancestry
Park was a member of the Goryeong Park clan, and he was a 29th generation descendant of the clan; among its various family branches, Park was from the Jikganggong Branch. One of his great-great-grandmothers was from the Jeonju Yi clan, the former ruling family of Joseon and the Korean Empire.
 Great-great-grandfather: Park Yung-hwan ( ?-1838), courtesy name Hwaeon. He was the son of Park Se-hyung and Lady Park of the Miryang Park clan.
 Great-great-grandmother: Lady Yi of the Jeonju Yi clan (1786–1849), daughter Yi Hyung-ho.
 Great-grandfather: Park Yi-chan ( ?-1846), courtesy name Muji.
 Great-grandmother: Lady Lee of the Seongju Lee clan, daughter of Lee-Yi-jeong.
 Grandfather: Park Yung-gyu ( 1840–1914), courtesy name Munseo.
 Grandmother: Lady Lee of Seongju Lee clan (1840–1915), daughter of Lee Bae-sik.
 Father: Park Sung-bin ( 1871–1938), courtesy name Hwaik.
 Mother: Baek Nam-eui ( 1872–1949); she was from the Suwon Baek clan and her father was Baek Nak-chun

Honours

National honours
:
 Recipient of the Grand Order of Mugunghwa
 Recipient of the Order of Merit for National Foundation (Order of the Republic of Korea)
 Recipient of the Order of Diplomatic Service Merit (Grand Gwanghwa Medal)
 Recipient of the Order of Service Merit (1st class)
 Recipient of the Order of National Security Merit (Tongil Medal)
 Recipient of the Order of Military Merit (Taegeuk Cordon Medal)
 Recipient of the Order of Civil Merit (Mugunghwa Medal)

Foreign honours
:
 Grand Cross of the Order of the Liberator General San Martín 
:
 Grand Star of the Decoration of Honour for Services to the Republic of Austria
:
 Grand Officer of the Order of José Matías Delgado 
:
 Grand Cordon of the Order of the Queen of Sheba 
:
 Grand Cross of the Order of Merit of the Federal Republic of Germany
:
 Knight Grand Cross with Collar of the Order of Merit of the Italian Republic 
:
 Honorary Recipient of the Most Exalted Order of the Crown of the Realm (1965)
:
 Grand Cross of the Order of the Aztec Eagle 
:
 Knight Grand Cross of the Order of the Netherlands Lion 
:
 Grand Officer of the National Order
:
	Grand Collar of the Order of Sikatuna
:
 Knight Grand Cross of the National Order of the Lion 
:
 Grand Cross of the National Order of Vietnam 
:
	Collar of the Order of Civil Merit
 :
 Special Grand Cordon of the Order of Propitious Clouds
:
 Knight of the Order of the Rajamitrabhorn (1966)
:
 Chief Commander of the Legion of Merit

In popular culture
 The President's Last Bang
The Man Standing Next
The President's Barber

See also 

 List of presidents of South Korea

Notes

References

Bibliography

External links
 
 

 
Fourth Republic of Korea
Presidents of South Korea
Acting presidents of South Korea
1917 births
1979 deaths
Korea Military Academy alumni
Anti-communism in South Korea
Assassinated heads of state
Assassinated heads of government
Assassinated South Korean politicians
Conflicts in 1968
Deaths by firearm in South Korea
Conservatism in South Korea
Right-wing populism in South Korea
Korean collaborators with Imperial Japan
Former Marxists
Korean nationalists
Korean people of Manchukuo
Korean people of the Vietnam War
Leaders who took power by coup
Male murder victims
People from Gumi, North Gyeongsang
South Korean anti-communists
South Korean Buddhists
South Korean generals
South Korean military personnel of the Korean War
South Korean military personnel
South Korean prisoners sentenced to death
Chung-hee
20th-century South Korean politicians
Politicide perpetrators
1979 murders in South Korea
Democratic Republican Party (South Korea) politicians
Recipients of the Order of Military Merit (Korea)
Grand Crosses Special Class of the Order of Merit of the Federal Republic of Germany
Recipients of the Order of the Liberator General San Martin
Recipients of the Grand Star of the Decoration for Services to the Republic of Austria
Recipients of the Order of the Netherlands Lion
Knights Grand Cross of the Order of Merit of the Italian Republic
Order of Civil Merit members
Recipients of the National Order of Vietnam
Chief Commanders of the Legion of Merit
Recipients of the Order of Merit for National Foundation
Recipients of the Order of Propitious Clouds
Grand Officers of the Order of José Matías Delgado
Military personnel of World War II
Burials at Seoul National Cemetery
Imperial Japanese Army Academy alumni
Recipients of orders, decorations, and medals of Ethiopia
Prisoners sentenced to death by South Korea